Pouteria squamosa is a species of plant in the family Sapotaceae. It is found in Guatemala and Mexico.

References

squamosa
Vulnerable plants
Taxonomy articles created by Polbot
Taxa named by Arthur Cronquist